The Greek Symbol Mystery is the 60th volume in the Nancy Drew Mystery Stories series. It was originally published in paperback in 1981 by the Wanderer imprint of Simon and Schuster. The original edition had a cover and six interior illustrations by Ruth Sanderson. The cover art was later revised by Garin Baker in 1986 for the last Wanderer printing, and again by Linda Thomas in 1989 for the Minstrel printing.

Plot summary

Nancy is asked to fly to Greece investigate the disappearance of money that was intended to help a needy village family, after the New York agency responsible for donations closes suddenly. While in Greece Nancy is told that a large inheritance from a Greek tycoon, meant for her friend Helen Nicholas, was stolen, and she agrees to find the culprit, aided by her friends Bess and George. They are also on the hunt for Helen’s cousin, Constantine. A poisonous snake in a basket of apples that was delivered to their room and a strange symbol stamped on a rare Byzantine mask that was dropped in Nancy’s shopping bag are the main clues, which lead Nancy and her friends to a ring of art smugglers and to the secret of the Greek symbol.  The working title for this story was "The Clue of the Ancient Mask" and listed as such in the proof copy printed of the previous title.

Places

Some real places (in Greece) mentioned in this book are 
 Loutraki
 Monastiraki
 Flea Market
 Skyros Hotel
 The Harbour of Piraeus
 The Theaters of Herodotus Atticus
 Acropolis
 Corfu Island
 Lycabettus Hill
 Plaka

Characters

INA version
 Nancy Drew
 Carson Drew: Nancy's father
 Hannah Gruen: Drew family housekeeper
 Bess Marvin: Nancy's best friend
 George Fayne: Nancy's best friend and Bess's first cousin
 Ned Nickerson: Nancy's boy friend
 Burt Eddleton: George's boy friend
 Dave Evans: Bess's boy friend
 Helen Nicholas: Nancy’s friend (not to be confused with Helen Corning). 
 Mrs. Jeanette Thompson: Nancy's neighbor who sends money to the Papadapoulos family
 Dimitri Georgiou  NY Photini Agency Manager
 Vatis : Lawyer, owner of the law firm Vatis & Vatis
 Isakos: Vatis's friends
 Constantine Nicholas: Helen's Cousin
 Diakos: Villain
 Alexis: Coast Guard
 Mousiadis: Nancy's father's friend
 Fotis: Ship Captain
 Stella Anagnost : Constantine's girl friend who works at the jewelry store where Nancy sees the mysterious golden mask
 Papadopoulos family: Mrs. Papadopoulos and her children -> Maria, Michali, Anna -> Mrs Thompson Donation's Receiver
 Peter Scourles: Vatis & Vatis employee

Greek-English Dictionary
Here are some Greek words and phrases that Nancy uses in the book.
Efharisto : Thank you
Parakalo : Wait a minute
Astinomikos tmima : Police quarter
Voithia : Help
Autokinito : Car
Mihaniko : Mechanic
Grigora : Hurry
Maiou : May
Nai : Yes
Mati : Amulet
Na min avaskathi : Hope you are all alright

Adaptation 
The 31st installment in the Nancy Drew point-and-click adventure game series by Her Interactive, named Nancy Drew: Labyrinth of Lies, is loosely based on the novel.

References

Nancy Drew books
1980 American novels
1980 children's books
Novels set in Greece
Simon & Schuster books
Novels adapted into video games
Children's mystery novels